Jussi Vesterinen (born 9 May 1949) is a Finnish wrestler. He competed in the men's Greco-Roman 52 kg at the 1968 Summer Olympics.

References

External links
 

1949 births
Living people
Finnish male sport wrestlers
Olympic wrestlers of Finland
Wrestlers at the 1968 Summer Olympics
People from Viitasaari
Sportspeople from Central Finland